Saratoga Township (T34N R7E) is one of seventeen townships in Grundy County, Illinois, USA.  As of the 2010 census, its population was 6,122 and it contained 2,541 housing units.

Geography

Cities, towns, villages
 Channahon (west edge)
 Morris (north half)

Unincorporated towns
 Fields of Saratoga at 
 Goode Subdivision at 
 Lisbon North at 
 Ridgecrest at 
(This list is based on USGS data and may include former settlements.)

Cemeteries
The township contains these three cemeteries: Catholic North, Cryder and Saratoga.

Major highways
  Interstate 80
  U.S. Route 6
  Illinois Route 47

Airports and landing strips
 Morris Municipal Airport
 Nelson Airport

Demographics

Political districts
 Illinois' 11th congressional district
 State House District 75
 State Senate District 38

References
 
 United States Census Bureau 2007 TIGER/Line Shapefiles
 United States National Atlas

External links
 City-Data.com
 Illinois State Archives

Townships in Grundy County, Illinois
Townships in Illinois
1849 establishments in Illinois